The 1816 United States presidential election in Indiana took place between November 1 to December 4, 1816, as part of the 1816 United States presidential election. The state legislature chose three representatives, or electors to the Electoral College, who voted for President and Vice President.

During this election, Indiana voted in its first presidential election and cast its three electoral votes to Democratic Republican candidate and Secretary of State James Monroe, with New York Governor Daniel D. Tompkins as his running mate.

Background
Indiana Territory was established on July 4th, 1800 to redraw Northwest Territory after Ohio Country was formed. Michigan Territory eventually took over most of Indiana Territory after Indiana was ready to become a state. However, this led to an electoral dispute in the next election. On December 11th, 1816, Indiana became the 19th state.

Electoral dispute
When the House and Senate met in joint session to count the electoral votes for President and Vice President on February 12, 1817. The count proceeded without incident until the roll came to the last state to be counted, which happened to be Indiana. At that point, Representative John W. Taylor of New York objected to the counting of Indiana's votes. He argued that Congress had acknowledged the statehood of Indiana in a joint resolution on December 11, 1816, whereas the ballots of the Electoral College had been cast on December 4, 1816. He claimed that at the time of the balloting, there had been merely the Indiana Territory, not a State of Indiana. Other representatives contradicted Taylor, asserting that the joint resolution merely recognized that Indiana had already joined the Union by forming a state constitution and government on June 29, 1816. These representatives pointed out that both the House and Senate had seated members from Indiana who had been elected prior to the joint resolution, which would have been unconstitutional had Indiana not been a state at the time of their election. Representative Samuel D. Ingham then moved that the question be postponed indefinitely. The House agreed almost unanimously, and the Senate was brought back in to count the electoral votes from Indiana.

Results
During this election, Indiana cast their electoral votes for James Monroe and Daniel D. Tompkins.

See also
 United States presidential elections in Indiana

References

Indiana
1816
1816 Indiana elections